Tarapacá Department was a department in Tarapacá Province, Chile, from 1883 to 1928. It was ceded to Chile under the Treaty of Ancón, formerly being part of the Peruvian province of the same name.

History
The department was created on 31 October 1884 under the administration of the also new Tarapacá Province, both awarded to Chile under the Treaty of Ancón, along with Tacna. It was bordered to the north by the Pisagua Department, to the east by the Andes, to the south by the Antofagasta Department, and to the west by the Pacific Ocean.

Administrative divisions

See also
 War of the Pacific
 Treaty of Ancón
 Consequences of the War of the Pacific
 Chilenization of Tacna, Arica and Tarapacá
 Tacna Province (Chile)
 Litoral Department
 Tarapacá Province
 Arica Province (Peru)
 Tarapacá Department (Peru)

References

Former departments of Chile